State Highway 35 (SH 35) is an unsigned,  state highway that runs along Quebec Street located in Denver, Colorado, United States. Its southern end is at Interstate 70 (I‑70) and it runs north until it reaches its northern end at 53rd Place. The route was added to the state highway system in 1972 to provide access to Stapleton International Airport from I-70. After the decommissioning of Stapleton Airport, the highway has been truncated from Martin Luther King Jr. Boulevard to I-70. An expansion was planned but funding was never materialized.

Route description
SH 35 begins at I‑70 and runs north along Quebec Street. North of I‑70, the route becomes Northfield Bouldevard/Quebec Street. It crosses Sand Creek and interchanges with Interstate 270. After I-270, it goes through a diamond interchange where Northfield Boulevard splits from Quebec Street and the route is only signed as Quebec Street from then on. SH 35 then continues north and ends at 53rd Place while Quebec Street continues northward towards Commerce City.

History

The route was established in 1972 as a road to Stapleton International Airport (now closed). It was planned to be extended in several locations, but it remains as a short highway. Future plans from the 1970s indicate that the route would have run all the way from the intersection of Quebec Street and Hampden Avenue north to Interstate 80 South (now I‑76), southwest of Barr Lake, but construction never began, even though the project was still listed in transportation plans until the late 1990s.

The route's southern end was at the Stapleton terminal access road from 1972 until 2000, when it was moved up to I‑70. The northern end of the highway moved up to 53rd Place between 1995 and 1996, before the Stapleton redevelopment started in 2000.

Exit list

See also

 List of state highways in Colorado

Notes

References

External links

SH 20 to SH 39 at the Highways of Colorado

035
Transportation in Denver